Flero is a comune in the province of Brescia, in Lombardy.

Notable people 

Dino Decca, painter
Andrea Pirlo, professional footballer

References

Gallery